La Fête chantée et autres essais de thème amérindien is the title of a collection of short stories written in French by French Nobel laureate J. M. G. Le Clézio and published in 1997 .

Table of contents
 La fête chantée
 Trois livres indiens
 La conquête divine du Michoacan
 De la fête à la guerre
 Le rêve d'or de l'Amérique indienne
 Les Chichimèques : Indigénisme et révolution
 Mythes amérindiens et littérature
 La corne d'abondance
 Jacobo Daciano à Tarécuato
 Trois célébrations du Mexique
 Peuple des oiseaux
 Dzibilnocac, écrit de nuit
 La voix indienne : Rigoberta Menchú
 Toutes choses sont liées
 La danse contre le déluge

Publication history

First French edition

References

Short story collections by J. M. G. Le Clézio
1997 short story collections
Works by J. M. G. Le Clézio